Shin Jae-won (born 16 September 1998) is a South Korean football midfielder who plays for Suwon FC.

Personal life
He is the son of Shin Tae-yong, the current coach of the Indonesia national football team.

References

External links 

1998 births
Living people
Association football midfielders
South Korean footballers
FC Seoul players
Suwon FC players
K League 1 players